Stricticollis is a genus of antlike flower beetles in the family Anthicidae. There are at least three described species in Stricticollis.

Species
These three species belong to the genus Stricticollis:
 Stricticollis longicollis (W.L.E.Schmidt, 1842) g
 Stricticollis tobias De Marseul, 1879 g b
 Stricticollis transversalis (A.Villa & J.B.Villa, 1833) g
Data sources: i = ITIS, c = Catalogue of Life, g = GBIF, b = Bugguide.net

References

Further reading

External links

 

Anthicidae